Cape Fear and Yadkin Valley Railway Passenger Depot is a historic train station located at Fayetteville, Cumberland County, North Carolina.  It was built in 1890 by the Cape Fear and Yadkin Valley Railway, and is a two-story brick passenger depot with a deep hip roof in the Romanesque Revival style. The seven bay by two bay building features a rounded brick arch arcade.  It operated as a passenger station until about 1900, after which it housed commercial enterprises. Passenger services were moved to a newer depot on the Fayetteville Cutoff.

It was listed on the National Register of Historic Places in 1983.

Fayetteville Area Transportation Museum
The building now houses the Fayetteville Area Transportation Museum, with displays about area transportation and local history, including a model train room and a recreated station agent's office.  The adjacent annex building includes vintage cars, a recreated 1920s gas station, a steam pump engine, exhibits on local law enforcement and fire department, farms life, Fort Bragg and Pope Army Air Field.

References

External links
 Fayetteville Area Transportation Museum - Fayetteville-Cumberland County Parks & Recreation

Railway stations on the National Register of Historic Places in North Carolina
Romanesque Revival architecture in North Carolina
Railway stations in the United States opened in 1890
Buildings and structures in Fayetteville, North Carolina
National Register of Historic Places in Cumberland County, North Carolina
Museums in Cumberland County, North Carolina
Transportation museums in North Carolina
Former railway stations in North Carolina